Gammarauders is a post-apocalyptic board wargame published by TSR, Inc., in which players act as the human handlers of giant mutant creatures called bioborgs. A 10-issue comic book series associated with the game was published by DC Comics. Three of these comics also featured a "micro-RPG" installment that allowed readers to create their own bioborgs and handlers. Despite its normally grim post-apocalypse setting, the game and comic series had a humorous atmosphere. An expansion set called Revenge of the Factoids was also released. It contained new bioborgs, new types of military units, and new types of terrain.

Setting 
Gammarauders takes place in the distant future during a time period called the Gamma Age. Nuclear war has devastated much of the world, leaving a few pockets of civilization separated by vast expanses of wasteland called "The Big Nada." Two major power groups formed after the war: The Gammarauders (who seek to rebuild the world) and the Slugnoids (who seek to dominate it). Among the ranks of the Gammarauders is a man named Professor Womba, inventor of the Womba Process. This process allows scientists to create bioborgs by mutating animals and implant them with nodes that can be fitted with weapons. The Slugnoids kill Womba and steal his research, allowing them to develop their own bioborgs as well.

In addition to mutated animals, another development in the Gamma Age are "pods." These plants are the power source for the new age. Due to their great value and importance the Gammarauders, Slugnoids, and other power groups of the Gamma Age fight over them constantly. Unfortunately, pods are unstable and are prone to bursting into beautiful (but useless) flowers.

The Gamma Age is also home to the Factoids, strange creatures that resemble walking television sets. According to game legend, a traveler accidentally activated a machine which started to produce Factoids at a rate of 1 every 43 seconds. Since then, Factoids wander the world of the Gamma Age collecting data and trying to learn everything they can. However, getting any useful information out of a factoid can be tricky. For example, in one of the comics a character asks how many units are in the approaching Slugnoid army. The factoid replies "All of them." The factoids also possess information from "The Golden Age," which is the time before the Gamma Age.

The Slugnoids and the Gammarauders are not the only power groups in the Gamma Age. There are also lesser groups called Cryptic Alliances. Six of these Alliances are detailed in the game world booklet and the comic series. The game world booklet gave detailed descriptions of the military and fortresses of the alliances, though from a game mechanic standpoint all units functioned the same way. The army units include infantry, hovertanks, and gammajets. These units are referred to as "popcorn" because the survivor of a bioborg attack reported the beast ripped through his unit like it was no more than popcorn.

The six major Cryptic Alliances include:

The Crimson Moon - A warrior clan that follows a Samurai-like tradition of honor. The infantry dresses in free-flowing robes and carry dart launching staffs. Elite units carry swords as well. A Crimson Moon hovertank is made of wicker and called "The Ghost that Walks the Mist." They are almost completely silent. Their gammajets resemble flying men. According to the game world book this design was adopted with hopes that bioborgs would hesitate before attacking. The plan backfired, though, and bioborgs "seem to enjoy munching on this type of gammajet the best." Their fortresses resemble the castles of ancient Japan. The symbol of the Crimson Moon is a samurai helm topped with a crescent moon.

Dah Boys - This alliance is modeled after an organized crime gang. Their infantry dresses in pinstripe suits and carries tommy guns. Their hovertanks resemble flying cars and are called "Doozyburgs." Their airforce vehicles resemble the bi-wing planes of World War 1. Their fortresses are always made of concrete. It is said many old allies of Dah Boys are found within these walls. "No longer alive-just within these walls." The symbol of Dah Boys is a tommy gun.

Friends of What's Left of the Earth ...or "FOWLOTEs" for short, is a militaristic hippie clan whose slogan is "Give peace a chance, or we'll nuke ya!" Their current leader has declared metal to be evil and all FOWLOTE equipment is made of modified organic material (bioborgs are exempt from this rule). FOWLOTE infantry wears tye-dyed armor and berets. They carry crossbows with bolts tipped with mutated animal bone. Though primitive, these weapons are more powerful than most blasters of the same size. Their hovertanks are made of a mutated wood that is as strong as steel. FOWLOTE gammajets are solar powered and resemble great birds. Their fortresses are made of interlocking triangles. The symbol of the FOWLOTEs is the peace sign.

The Lab Rats - The Lab Rats is a group of scientists. According to the world book the Lab Rats respected Professor Womba but felt he fell into a bad crowd with his "science for a higher cause" attitude. After all, the purpose of science is (as any fool knows) to create more science. Lab Rat infantry wear pants that are several inches too short and oversized lab coats complete with protective lenses, calculators and pens. Despite their comical appearance, few people dare insult a Lab Rat since they also carry large, nasty looking bazookas. Lab Rat hovertanks are often made of unusual materials like ice preserved by a plastic spray and shatterproof glass. Their gammajets are essentially hovertanks with wings. How the Lab Rats get these non-aerodynamic vehicles off the ground is a mystery. The primary weapon of both the hovertank and the gammajet is a gun that fires ice projectiles. It is said Lab Rat fortresses look like a high school where a chemistry experiment went horribly wrong. Usually half the fortress is unstable due failed experiments or "recently disproved engineering theories." The symbol of the Lab Rats is a microscope.

The Men in Black - A mysterious organization inspired by a popular government conspiracy, the Men in Black dress in black suits, black hats, and dark sunglasses. Their preferred weapon is a semi-automatic machine gun. Both their gammajets and hovertanks resemble black disks with white serial numbers painted on the side. The Men in Black change these numbers frequently to confuse opponents. Although their vehicles are maneuverable, their tactics are said to be very predictable. Their fortresses are designed to look like the fortresses of other Cryptic Alliances, but "...they always paint the forts black, so it doesn't fool anyone." The symbol of the Men in Black is a wide brim hat with a pair of sunglasses.

The Rayzors - This alliance is modeled after a motorcycle gang. It is said they dislike the Gammarauders for "their sickening abundance of morals" and the Slugnoids for their "lack of class." They are commanded by an individual known as the Leader of the Pack. Their infantry rides motorcycles, wear leather jackets, and carry a variety of weapons (though they prefer to engage in hand-to-hand combat whenever possible). Their hovertanks and gammajets both resemble motorcycles modified to hover or fly. As might be expected, their armor and air force is lightly armored but fast and highly maneuverable. Most of a Rayzor fortress is located below the ground. The only part above ground is the workshop, which is constantly repairing and modifying Rayzor equipment. The Rayzors' symbol is a dagger with a spiked handguard.

Gameplay 
The game came with several hexagonal tiles with various types of terrain (water, cities, mountains, etc.). This allowed the players to create many different scenarios instead of playing on the same field every time. Each player selected a bioborg. Each bioborg had special ability and a limited number of slots in which to hold weapons and shields. Each player also selected one of the Cryptic Alliances and a location to build a fortress.

The object of the game was fairly straightforward: demolish three opposing fortresses (in a 4-6 player game) or everyone else's fortress in a 2-3 person game. During the course of the game each player could attempt to gather pods which could be used to improve a die roll, rebuild a destroyed fortress, and in some cases use a bioborg's special ability. Players also had the opportunity to draw cards to gain additional weapons, shields, and Factoids.

Each weapon had an attack rating and range. Shields added to defense. Factoid cards could do a wide variety of things, such as freezing an opponent in its tracks or calling in reinforcements. Actions were resolved by rolling a ten sided die. The bioborg could also travel with three different types of support units: infantry, gammajets, and hovertanks. These units had their own movement rules and aided the bioborg in combat. The "Revenge of the Factoids" expansion added three new types of support units: veterans (double-strength infantry), transports (for carrying infantry), and thundertubes (artillery pieces).

The comic series 
TSR also released comic book series through DC Comics in 1988-89. It did not include any characters from the Revenge of the Factoids expansion set. The series only ran 10 issues and was canceled near the end of 1989 due to poor sales. The end of issue #10 included a brief summary of what would have happened had the series continued.

Issues #1, 3, and 4 contained the Gammarauder's Micro-RPG role-playing game system. The installments included information on how to create handler and bioborg characters, game mechanics, and equipment. The game used a six-sided die for resolving actions and rolling up character attributes.

Handlers were rated in the following categories: Bod (the handler's physical fitness), Control (the handler's ability to keep his cool and command his bioborg), Style (the handler's ability to make a good impression), Science (the handler's ability to understand and use technology), and Rumble (the handler's fighting ability). Each handler also had a Complex, or personality quirk that influenced the character's actions (such as hating a particular color or having a rivalry with another character).

Bioborgs had similar statistics: Bod (size and strength, which was multiplied by 10 due to the bioborg's size), Brains (which had a maximum rating of 2 since bioborgs weren't too intelligent), Control (the bioborg's ability to resist commands), Armament (how many weapons the bioborg can carry), and Power (the number of Pods the bioborg can eat without becoming sick).

Reviews
 Casus Belli #42 (Dec 1987)

References

External links 
 
 Gammarauders at RPG.net

Board games introduced in 1987
Board games with a modular board
Post-apocalyptic games
Science fiction board wargames
TSR, Inc. games